Saraimeh or Saraymeh or Sereymeh or Serimeh or Soreymeh or Sarimeh may refer to:
 Saraimeh, Mahshahr
 Sarimeh, Shushtar